Jamara is a genus of Australian araneomorph spiders in the family Toxopidae, containing the single species, Jamara pisinna. It was  first described by V. T. Davies in 1995, and has only been found in Australia.

References

Monotypic Araneomorphae genera
Spiders of Australia
Toxopidae
Taxa named by Valerie Todd Davies